This article shows the qualification phase for 2019–20 CEV Women's Champions League. 7 teams will play in qualification round. The two remaining teams will join the other 18 teams automatically qualified to the League round based on the European Cups' Ranking List. All 5 eliminated teams will then compete in 2019–20 Women's CEV Cup.

Participating teams
Drawing of lots took place on 26 June 2019 in Luxembourg.

First round
No First round matches

Second round
 6 teams compete in this round. Winners advance to the Third round and losers compete in CEV Cup
VK UP Olomouc got a virtual bye to Third round.

|}

First leg

|}

Second leg

|}

Third round
4 teams compete in this round.
Winners enter the League round and loser will compete in CEV Cup.

|}

First leg

|}

Second leg

|}

References

Qualification
2019 in women's volleyball